Eudonia speideli is a species of moth in the family Crambidae. It is found on Crete and in Turkey.

References

Moths described in 1982
Eudonia
Moths of Europe